Chhaula is a village in the Nakodar tehsil of Jalandhar District of the Indian state of Punjab. The village is administered by the Sarpanch, an elected representative.

Demographics 
According to the 2011 Census, Chhaula has a population of 468. The village has a literacy rate of 79.80%, higher than the average literacy rate of Punjab.

Most villagers belong to a Schedule Caste (SC), comprising 36.97% of the total.

Education 
The village has a co-ed primary school (Pri Chhaula School) which provide a mid-day meal as per the Indian Midday Meal Scheme and it was founded in 1971.

Transport 

References 

Villages in Jalandhar district
Villages in Nakodar tehsil